Chợ Vàm is an urban municipality (trấn thuộc huyện) and capital town of the Phú Tân District of An Giang Province, Vietnam.

Cho Vam Town has an area of 17.06 km², with a population of about 20,000 in 1999, [1] with a population density of 1,060 people per km².

The administrative boundary of Cho Vam town: in the east and north it borders on Dong Thap province (separated by Tien river), Phu Thanh commune in the west, Phu An commune in the south.

Communes of An Giang province
Populated places in An Giang province
Townships in Vietnam